Buffalo City Stadium (also known as the BCM Stadium) is a multi-use stadium in East London, South Africa.  It is currently used mostly for Rugby Union matches and is the home stadium of Border Bulldogs.  The stadium holds 16,000 people.

The stadium has undergone three name changes. Originally, it was named Border Rugby Union Grounds, which was changed to the Basil Kenyon Stadium, after the Springbok player who captained the Springboks on a successful 3-month tour of England in 1951.
It has also been called ABSA Stadium, for sponsorship reasons. On 26 June 2010, The BCM Stadium hosted a Test match between Italy and South Africa. South Africa won 55–11.

Notable matches 

In August 1978, 5,500 spectators at the stadium watched the South African Country Districts XV beat the touring American Cougars 44–12.

1995 Rugby World Cup 
The stadium was one of the host venues for the 1995 Rugby World Cup. It hosted 3 first round matches in Pool B during the tournament.

References

See also 

 List of stadiums in South Africa
 List of African stadiums by capacity

Soccer venues in South Africa
Rugby union stadiums in South Africa
Rugby World Cup stadiums
East London, Eastern Cape
Sports venues in the Eastern Cape
Sports venues completed in 1934
1934 establishments in South Africa